Elizabeth Li is a Hong Kong international lawn bowler.

Bowls career
Elizabeth Li was selected as part of the five woman team by Hong Kong for the 2008 World Outdoor Bowls Championship, which was be held in Christchurch, New Zealand.

She won a triples gold medal (with Grace Chu and Camilla Leung), at the 2005 Asia Pacific Bowls Championships, held in Melbourne. Two years later she won a fours bronze at the 2007 event.

References

Hong Kong female bowls players
Living people
Year of birth missing (living people)